It was a Dacian fortified town.

External links
Cetatea zmeilor

References

Dacian fortresses in Romania, Bihor County
Historic monuments in Bihor County
History of Crișana